The Berlin pedestal relief is part of the base of a granite pedestal of an unprovenanced Ancient Egyptian statue containing an inscription describing Egypt's war victories. According to the German archaeologist Manfred Görg, the inscription on the pedestal may have originally contained one of the oldest known references to Israel, equal to or older than the inscription in the Merneptah Stele by two centuries. The artifact is kept in the Egyptian Museum of Berlin (ÄM 21687).

Description 
In 1913, a fragment of the pedestal base was purchased from an antiquities trader named M. Nachman by Egyptologist Ludwig Borchardt (1863–1938), along with another granite pedestal relief of similar size (50 × 38 cm, ÄM 21688). The preserved fragment measures approximately 40 × 46 cm. The preserved part shows three prisoners tied with a rope around their necks. Each prisoner has a cartouche with the name of his country of origin:
 The first cartouche (on the left) may refer to Ashkelon 
 The middle cartouche may refer to Canaan
 The last cartouche (on the right) is partially broken off. In 2001, Manfred Görg proposed that the missing mark was a symbol of a vulture (Gardiner sign G1, representing Egyptian alef); further imaging studies have added weight to this assessment. Görg suggested that the word would then read "Israel", but even with the vulture sign such a spelling of the word Israel would be unique in the Egyptian texts.

Dating 
The dating of the Berlin pedestal is difficult to establish because it was not discovered in situ and has no provenance. Despite containing just a few words, it contains many spelling differences versus previously known inscriptions. Based on the writing itself, the Berlin pedestal is reminiscent of a spelling from 18th Dynasty of Egypt in the time period ca.1550-1292 B.C.E.

Bibliography
 
 Manfred Görg: Israel in Hieroglyphen. In: Biblische Notizen'. Band 106, 2001, S. 21–27.

Footnotes 

15th-century BC steles
1913 archaeological discoveries
Ancient Egyptian stelas
Victory steles
Ancient Israel and Judah
Foreign contacts of ancient Egypt